Fannin is an unincorporated community located in northwest Rankin County, Mississippi, United States, near the cities of Jackson, Flowood, Brandon, and Ridgeland, loosely bordered by the Pearl River (presently the Ross Barnett Reservoir following impoundment) and Pelahatchie Creek. Originally occupied by Native Americans, the eventual settlement became a thriving agricultural-based town post Civil War, through the first half of the twentieth century. The decline of the railroads, the impoundment of the Pearl River, and the general migration of settlers toward nearby cities led to Fannin's eventual dis-incorporation and transition into a mostly rural residential community (though a few small businesses remain).

Early history and settlement
The area comprising eventual Fannin was originally inhabited by Choctaw and Chickasaw tribes. Following Mississippi being granted statehood in 1817- as well as the expulsion of local Indian tribes to Oklahoma- early settlers from the Carolinas claimed available land grants in the 1830s. The first settlers of Fannin were drawn to the area largely due to the abundance of grazing land, timber resources, and natural springs. These handful of early settler further sub-divided their land holdings to other settlers over a roughly 60 year period, resulting in moderate population growth, and the establishment of thriving timber and agricultural industries by 1900.

The town of Fannin
By approximately 1840, inhabitants of the area were starting to identify as a town proper, referred to then as the "little city" of Fannin. Local lore suggests the town took the name "Fannin" after a soldier of the same name died in a house fire. A small city section of schools, churches, stores, and other small businesses developed, centralized among the estates of land owners and slave holders. Still largely agriculturally based, the years approaching the turn of the century saw the growth of saw and timber mills, cotton gins, and livestock-based industries. Educational institution sprouted up, attended by children of wealthy land owners. Schoolhouses were maintained for the children of slaves and black free-men. A community college was established by a local chapter of Masons, which housed in its tower a silver bell, cast from metal of 200 silver-dollars donated by wealthy residents. The sound of the bell ringing became a staple of the Fannin community, but was lost, or perhaps stolen, when the college transitioned to a new location in the early 20th century.

New Fannin and decline
The 1920s was a period of transition for the town of Fannin. Railroad lines were established just west of the town proper, where a terminal was built to service the towns of Jackson and Union. Many industries and businesses, most notably the Masonic college, were relocated three miles to the west of the original city center in order to be better served by the train line. This area became known as "New Fannin," and though the rail line opened up the community to more convenient access to nearby cities, it also marked the slow decline of the town's population, as industry and business migrated from the city center, and school children began being served by schools outside of the town proper. Slowly, the town of Fannin dissipated, and New Fannin never developed into the thriving city center that "old" Fannin had once been.

Modern day Fannin community
From about 1930 to present-day, Fannin slowly devolved from an established town, into a rural farm community, and finally into little more than a geographic point of reference and curiosity known by local residents. A small grouping of churches and businesses remain at the intersection of present-day Fannin Landing Circle and Highway 471, marking the remains of the once thriving city center. The turning point of Fannin's decline can be traced, largely, back to the mid-1950s, following the dismantlement of the rail-line, when the Pearl River was impounded to create the Ross Barnett Reservoir in an effort to provide a drinking water resource for the nearby city of Jackson. At that time, a state agency- the Pearl River Valley Water Supply District (PRVWSD)- was created to manage the newly created watershed land. Land for residential development became much more valuable than for agricultural and industrial use, and, as a result, land sales focused more on the building of new homes in the rural setting, rather than large expanses of farm or timber land. Nearby cities of Jackson, Flowood, Brandon, and Ridgeland serve as city centers for Fannin residents’ commercial needs; school children attend Rankin County Schools based in Brandon; and, ultimately, following improvements in roads and transportation methods, the infrastructure of a town proper in the Fannin community became unnecessary. Today, Fannin is little more than an intersection of two rural roads, surrounded by a few old farmhomes, and mostly modern residential developments and subdivisions.

References

Unincorporated communities in Rankin County, Mississippi
Unincorporated communities in Mississippi